Daniel Mark "Doc" Severson (born August 31, 1954) is an American Republican politician. He is a former member of the Minnesota House of Representatives who represented District 14A, which includes portions of Benton and Stearns counties in the north central part of the state. He is a retired U.S. Navy fighter pilot, business owner, and substitute teacher. As of 2022, Severson is a current candidate for the District 4 School Board Member of the Lee County School District in Florida.

Early life, education, and military service
Severson graduated from St. Cloud State University in St. Cloud in 1979 with a B.A. in Physics. He was a Navy fighter pilot, officer and commander from 1978 to 2000.

Severson enlisted in the Navy in 1978 at the age of 21. Severson was in the Navy for 22 years, most of those years as a Strike-Fighter Pilot. Severson flew both the A-7 and FA-18 Hornet Strike Fighter during his career. Severson is a member of the United States Navy Fighter Weapons School also known as TOPGUN. Severson was stationed in Asia, Southern California, and Washington, D.C. During his time as a Naval Pilot, Severson's name was misread as Doc Severinsen, earning him the call sign "Doc".

Minnesota House of Representatives

Elections
In 2002, after redistricting, Severson ran for the newly redrawn Minnesota House District 14A and won defeating DFL nominee Dennis Molitor 49%-47%. In 2004, he won re-election to a second term with 62% of the vote. In 2006, he won re-election to a third term with 54% of the vote. In 2008, he won re-election to a fourth term with 55% of the vote.

Tenure
He was House Republican Minority Whip. He co-sponsored a bill that would eliminate second-hand smoke in bars and restaurants. In 2008, he supported Republican Governor Tim Pawlenty when he vetoed a $3.2 billion budget increase paid for by higher taxes. In 2009, he introduced an amendment to the Minnesota State Constitution to prohibit marriage or civil unions between same-sex couples.

Committee assignments
Severson was a member of  the House Agriculture, Rural Economies and Veterans Affairs Subcommittee for the Veterans Affairs Division, and the Finance subcommittees for the Housing Finance and Policy and Public Health Finance Division, the Public Safety Finance Division, and the Transportation Finance and Policy Division.

2010 Secretary of State campaign
In October 2009, Severson announced that he had filed the paperwork to run for Minnesota Secretary of State, seeking the Republican Party's endorsement for his candidacy at their 2010 state convention. He received the party's endorsement on April 29, 2010, and challenged incumbent Secretary of State Mark Ritchie in the November 2010 general election.

In his filing for Secretary of State, Severson sought to be listed using his Navy pilot call name Doc Severson, some thought it to be an allusion to former Tonight Show band leader Doc Severinsen. Severson was challenged because he had not previously appeared on the ballot with the nickname "Doc." Severson stated the nickname had been given to him as he went through flight training and followed him through his 22 year career.

Severson ran for Secretary of State on the contention that there was widespread fraud in the recount of the 2008 Senate election and a requirement that voters show a Photo ID to vote. Incumbent Democratic Secretary of State Mark Ritchie won re-election and defeated Severson 49%-46% .

2012 U.S. Senate campaign

On May 16, 2011, Severson announced that he would seek the Republican party's endorsement for the U.S. Senate seat held by Democrat Amy Klobuchar. However, he lost the endorsement at the party convention and withdrew in favor of State Representative Kurt Bills. Klobuchar was re-elected in a landslide.

2014 Secretary of State campaign

Severson ran for Secretary of State again in 2014. After winning the party endorsement ahead of former State Senator John Howe, Severson was unopposed in the primary election. He lost the general election to Democratic State Representative Steve Simon by 901,450 votes (47.04%) to 879,022 (45.87%).

2020 U.S. House of Representatives campaign
Severson moved to Florida in 2015. During his campaign, Severson made a tweet including the hashtag "#WWG1WGA", a slogan used by followers of the QAnon conspiracy theory.

2022 Lee County School District campaign
Following immense discontent for the prior school board amongst Lee County citizens, Severson decided to run as a candidate for the District 4 Board Member's position, which encompasses parts of the Cape Coral area in the west side of the county. His primary stances when campaigning were:

 To place parents in charge of what their student is exposed to in the classroom
 To maintain safety on school grounds via the "Guardian program"
 To keep school choice in the hands of the parents
 To keep Critical Race Theory (CRT) and the 1619 Project out of the curriculum
 And to work to create a visible and open annual district budget, stating "For too long, the voices of taxpayers and parents have been ignored by an out-of-control School Board that answers to far-left liberal interest instead of the families and taxpayers of Lee County."

As of August 23, 2022, Dan Severson is a current candidate for the district.

References

External links

1954 births
Living people
Republican Party members of the Minnesota House of Representatives
People from Mora, Minnesota
People from Sauk Rapids, Minnesota
St. Cloud State University alumni
United States Navy officers
21st-century American politicians
Florida Republicans
Candidates in the 2020 United States elections
Military personnel from Minnesota